Ravne pri Šmartnem is a dispersed settlement of isolated farmsteads above the Tuhinj Valley in the Municipality of Kamnik in the Upper Carniola region of Slovenia.

Name
The name of the settlement was changed from Ravne to Ravne pri Šmartnem in 1953.

References

External links
Ravne pri Šmartnem on Geopedia

Populated places in the Municipality of Kamnik